Lian Li Industrial Co., Ltd. is a Taiwanese computer case and accessories manufacturer.  It is one of the largest manufacturers of aluminium computer cases in Taiwan and is also a major world competitor in the premium aftermarket computer case industry.

Products
Lian Li cases are constructed with either brushed or anodised aluminium and are lightweight and offered in silver, black, grey, golden, red, blue, and green shades. In addition to their various cases, they produce aluminum desks, power supplies and accessories such as window kits, CPU coolers, fans, removable hard drive bays, bezel covers, and memory card readers. The company also provides OEM and ODM services.

History
Lian Li Industrial Co., Ltd was founded in 1983.

Location
It has its headquarters in the Liudu Industrial Park (六堵工業區, Liùdǔ Gōngyèqū) in Keelung.

Subsidiary brand
In 2009 Lian Li launched LanCool as a subsidiary to produce cases without their signature aluminium in an effort to bring costs down.  These cases feature a tool-less architecture aimed at gamers and PC enthusiasts.  With LanCool producing the non-aluminium midtower cases, Lian Li is well known as a high-end aluminium chassis manufacturer. In August 2018, after years without new product releases, Lian Li revived the LanCool branding and presented the LanCool One chassis featuring tempered glass panels and RGB lighting.

See also
 List of companies of Taiwan
 Antec
 Cooler Master	
 NZXT	
 Razer	
 SilverStone Technology
 Thermaltake
 Zalman

 Case modding

References

External links

 Lian Li Industrial Co, Ltd. Official Homepage /

1983 establishments in Taiwan
Companies established in 1983
Computer enclosure companies
Computer power supply unit manufacturers
Companies based in Keelung
Electronics companies of Taiwan
Taiwanese brands